Frecker Ridge is a ridge that rises abruptly along the west side of Kirkby Glacier in the Anare Mountains of Victoria Land, Antarctica. It was named by the Australian National Antarctic Research Expeditions (ANARE) after Sergeant R. Frecker, Royal Australian Air Force, a member of the Antarctic Flight with the ANARE (Thala Dan) cruise that explored this coast, 1962. The feature lies on the Pennell Coast, a portion of Antarctica lying between Cape Williams and Cape Adare.

References

Ridges of Victoria Land
Pennell Coast
Antarctic region